Brigitte Affidehome Tonon is a Beninois researcher, author former basketball player and head coach of Benin men's national basketball team. Having coached Benin at the regional 2017 FIBA AfroBasket qualifiers, Tonon became the first woman in Africa to coach a men's national basketball team.

Background 
Tonon was born to Pierre Coffi Tonon, who as of 2017 was the Secretary General of the Federation Beninoise de Basketball (FBBB)

She has a PhD in Exercise Physiology from the University of Abomey-Calavi (UAC)

Career 
In 2017, Tonon was named head coach of the Benin men's national basketball team in 2017 and was in charge of the team during the 2017 FIBA Afrobasket Qualifiers in Cotonou where she coached the team to a 69-61 victory over Burkina Faso. Tonon works at the Benin Sports Institute in Porto Novo as a Coaches, Instructor

As a holder of a PhD in Exercise Physiology, Tonon is a published author on the same subject.

See also

References

External links 

 Website of the Benin Basketball Federation
 Published works of Brigitte Affidehome Tonon

Living people
Beninese women
Beninese women's basketball players
Beninese sports coaches
Beninese sports executives and administrators
Basketball coaches
Beninese academics
Year of birth missing (living people)